The Last Floor (Spanish: El último piso) is a 1962 Argentine drama film directed by Daniel Cherniavsky.

The film's art direction was by Gori Muñoz.

Cast
 Norma Aleandro 
 Martín Andrade 
 Santiago Arrieta 
 José De Angelis 
 Beatriz Fabre
 Lydia Lamaison 
 Inda Ledesma 
 Raúl Luar 
 Ubaldo Martínez 
 Carlos Olivieri
 Ignacio Quirós 
 María Luisa Robledo 
 Martha Roldán

References

Bibliography 
 Helene C. Weldt-Basson. Postmodernism's Role in Latin American Literature: The Life and Work of Augusto Roa Bastos. Springer, 2010.

External links 
 
 

1962 films
1962 drama films
Argentine drama films
1960s Spanish-language films
Films directed by Daniel Cherniavsky
1960s Argentine films